Inhlawulo , in Swazi/Zulu law, is a fine or damages paid

In Zulu culture, inhlawulo refers to damages paid to the family of a woman who became pregnant out of wedlock by the father of the future child.

References

Child support
Law of Eswatini
Zulu culture